WCEA-LD, virtual channel 26, is a Spanish language low-power television station serving the Boston market. The station is owned by C&M Broadcasting Corporation. WCEA-LD is co-owned with El Planeta, a local Spanish language newspaper.

History
WCEA-LD was founded by Pedro Nicolas Cuenca in 1986 as W19AH, becoming WCEA-LP in 1995. It has always been a platform for local multicultural independent producers in the Boston market. The station also served as Boston's Telemundo affiliate in the early 1990s, before W32AY (now WYCN-LD in Providence, Rhode Island) signed on in 1995.

Initially broadcasting on channel 19, WCEA-LP was forced to vacate the channel to accommodate the digital signal of WGBH-TV. In 2002, it moved to channel 3 via special temporary authority, but its application for the channel was subsequently dismissed by the Federal Communications Commission due to objections from other Boston stations, AT&T Broadband, and RCN; soon thereafter, WCEA-LP relocated to channel 58.

Since December 2010, Massachusetts Spanish TV Network (MAS TV) has partnered with WCEA-LD to provide programming, including local newscasts at 6 a.m. and noon.

In the early 2010s, WCEA-LP had two applications convert to digital operations on channels 44 and 45, with both specifying a transmitter location atop the John Hancock Tower; the station ultimately chose to build the channel 45 facility.

Digital Television

Digital channels
 26.1 main WCEA-LD programming / MAS TV
 26.2 teleSUR Boston
 26.3 Cristovisión
 26.4 Telemicro
 26.5 Telecentro
 26.6 Tele Antillas

References

External links

Cuban-American culture
Low-power television stations in the United States
Dominican-American culture
Hispanic and Latino American culture in Boston
Puerto Rican culture in the United States
Spanish-language mass media in Massachusetts
Spanish-language television stations in Massachusetts
Television channels and stations established in 1986
CEA-LD